The Other Love is a 1947 American film noir drama romance film directed by Andre DeToth and starring Barbara Stanwyck, David Niven, and Richard Conte. Written by Ladislas Fodor and Harry Brown based on the story "Beyond" by Erich Maria Remarque, the film is about a concert pianist who is sent to a sanatorium in Switzerland to treat a serious lung illness.

In his review for The New York Times, Bosley Crowther called the film "a typical artificial romance on the heart-rending theme of Camille".

Plot
Not knowing her illness is terminal, concert pianist Karen Duncan checks into a Switzerland sanatorium under the care of Dr. Tony Stanton, whose stern manner Karen does not like. One day she and another patient, Celestine Miller, enjoy a day away from the clinic and a night on the town, despite their doctor's advice.

Auto racer Paul Clermont is introduced to Karen and invites her to Monte Carlo. Although she is attracted to her doctor, Tony's seeming lack of interest in anything but her health causes Karen to accept Paul's invitation. She gambles, smokes and drinks, then returns to the sanatorium to discover that Celestine has died.

Panic-stricken, Karen's first impulse is to follow her doctor's orders to refrain from exerting herself. She disobeys, going away with Paul again and endangering her well-being. Only at the last possible minute does she return to Tony's side, where he proposes marriage to her and watches carefully as their future together hangs by a thread.

Cast
 Barbara Stanwyck as Karen Duncan
 David Niven as Dr. Anthony Stanton
 Richard Conte as Paul Clermont
 Gilbert Roland as Croupier
 Joan Lorring as Celestine Miller
 Lenore Aubert as Yvonne Dupré
 Maria Palmer as Huberta
 Natalie Schafer as Dora Shelton

See also
 Bobby Deerfield (1977)

References

External links
 
 
 
 

1947 films
1947 romantic drama films
American romantic drama films
Films directed by Andre DeToth
Films based on works by Erich Maria Remarque
Films about diseases
Films set in hospitals
Films set in Switzerland
Films set in Monaco
American black-and-white films
1940s American films